
Urbana can refer to:

Places

Italy
Urbana, Italy

United States
Urbana, Illinois
Urbana (conference), a Christian conference formerly held in Urbana, Illinois
Urbana, Indiana
Urbana, Iowa
Urbana, Kansas
Urbana, Maryland
Urbana, Missouri
Urbana, New York
Urbana, Ohio
Urbana University

Other uses
Urbana (payment card), used for public transportation in Ljubljana, Slovenia
University of Illinois Urbana-Champaign
UrbanA project (urban arenas for sustainable and just cities): a three-year project, funded by the European Union, on urban sustainability and justice.

See also
Urbanna, Virginia